Cláudio Lopes (born 28 February 1992) is an Angolan handball player for Primeiro de Agosto and the Angolan national team.

He represented Angola at the 2019 World Men's Handball Championship.

References

1992 births
Living people
Angolan male handball players
Competitors at the 2019 African Games
African Games competitors for Angola
African Games medalists in handball
African Games gold medalists for Angola